Chuzo  may refer to the following people:

 Ryuson Chuzo Matsuyama (1880-1954), Japanese landscape artist
 Chuzo Tamotzu (1888-1975), Japanese painter
 Antonio González Álvarez aka Chuzo (born 1940), Spanish footballer